Jonathan Laidlaw KC (February 1960) is an English barrister notable for prosecuting and defending in many high-profile criminal cases, including defence of News International chief executive Rebekah Brooks who was acquitted of all charges after the phone hacking trial.
In 2012 he was chosen by the Football Association to present their case against John Terry. On 31 May 2022, he applied to be admitted as a lawyer in Malaysia to serve as lead counsel for former Malaysian Prime Minister Najib Razak to appeal the latter's criminal convictions in Malaysia. The application was dismissed by the Malaysia High Court on July 21, 2022.

Career at the Bar

Laidlaw was called to the Bar in 1982. He practises at 2 Hare Court in the Inner Temple, where in 2013 he was appointed the head of chambers. He sat as a Crown Court Recorder since 1998  and in 2008 was appointed Queen's Counsel.

Treasury Counsel
As Treasury Counsel, Laidlaw brought Britain's first war crimes case and acted as prosecution in the trial of the Provisional IRA bombing of Canary Wharf, the Official Secrets Act prosecution of Richard Tomlinson and David Shayler, the Jill Dando murder trial, the trial of the Al Qaeda cell that planned pre-9/11 attacks in the United States and United Kingdom, the trial of the Al Qaeda attack on Glasgow Airport and of Delroy Grant who received four life sentences and is believed responsible for roughly 100 cases of rape, sexual assault and burglary.

See also

References

External links
 Chambers and Partners: Jonathan Laidlaw QC
 Legal 500: Jonathan Laidlaw QC

English barristers
Living people
English King's Counsel
21st-century King's Counsel
Members of the Inner Temple
Lawyers from London
21st-century English lawyers
Trial lawyers
Public defenders
Government lawyers
Prosecutors
British civil rights activists
Criminal defense lawyers
International criminal law scholars
International law scholars
British prosecutors
1960 births
British barristers
20th-century English lawyers